The College of Natural Sciences at The University of Texas at Austin offers 10 Bachelor of Arts majors, 42 Bachelor of Science majors, and 20 graduate programs to more than 11,000 undergraduates and 1,400 graduate students. The college employs over 370 faculty. Many of the programs are consistently ranked in the top ten nationally, according to U.S. News & World Report (2019), including: Analytical Chemistry (4th), Applied Math (9th), Artificial Intelligence (8th), Computer Science (10th), Computing Systems (8th), Computing Theory (7th), Cosmology/Relativity/Gravity (10th), Ecology, Evolution and Behavior (6th), Mathematics Analysis (7th), Plasma Physics (3rd), Programming Language (8th), and Topology (8th). It was established in 1883.

Departments
 Department of Astronomy
 Department of Chemistry
 Department of Computer Science
 Department of Human Development and Family Sciences
 School of Human Ecology
 Department of Integrative Biology
 Marine Science Institute
 Department of Mathematics
 Department of Molecular Biosciences
 Department of Neuroscience
 Department of Nutritional Sciences
 Department of Physics
 Department of Statistics and Data Sciences
 Freshman Research Initiative

Homework System
The College of Natural Sciences has an online assignment submission system unique to this college, known as Quest Learning and Assessment. The Quest system allows professors to add assignments and allows students to access and provide all answers to those assignments online. Furthermore, the commonly used in-class response system, iClicker, can be linked onto this website, allowing students to keep track of their progress throughout the class in one place.

Honors Program
The College of Natural Sciences administers five honors programs at the University of Texas at Austin.

The Dean's Scholars Honors Program accepts about 30 freshmen and 20 sophomores each fall, maintaining a size of more than 200 total undergraduates. The Dean's Scholars Student Association is elected to represent the program in college affairs.

The Health Science Honors (HSH) Program is for students specifically interested in the health professions. It accepts about 50 students per year.

The Turing Scholars Honors Program accepts outstanding computer science majors each fall, and is represented by the Turing Scholars Student Association. It is also possible for an undergraduate to double-major in Dean's Scholars and Turing Scholars.

Polymathic Scholars (PS) is the certificate program for honors students in the College of Natural Sciences with interests that stretch beyond their major.

The School of Human Ecology offers two honors program options for highly motivated students: "Honors in Advanced Human Development and Family Sciences" and "Honors in Advanced Nutritional Sciences."

Notable faculty
Allen J. Bard, winner of the 2002 Priestley Medal, co-winner of the 2008 Wolf Prize in Chemistry, winner of the National Medal of Science (2011) and winner of the Enrico Fermi Award (2014)
Luis Caffarelli, winner of the Rolf Schock Prize award (2005), the Wolf Prize in Mathematics (2012), and the Shaw Prize (2018).
Livia S. Eberlin, winner of a MacArthur Fellowship (2018)
E. Allen Emerson, winner of the 2007 Turing Award
David Hillis, winner of a MacArthur Fellowship (1999)
Allan H. MacDonald, winner of the 2020 Wolf Prize in Physics
Nancy A. Moran, winner of a MacArthur Fellowship (1997)
Philip Treisman, winner of a MacArthur Fellowship (1992)
Karen Uhlenbeck, winner of a MacArthur Fellowship (1983), the National Medal of Science (2000), the Abel Prize (2019) and the Steele Prize (2020).
Steven Weinberg, winner of the 1979 Nobel Prize in Physics and the National Medal of Science  (1991)
John Archibald Wheeler, winner of the 1997 Wolf Prize in Physics
C. Grant Willson, winner of the National Medal of Technology and Innovation (2007), the Japan Prize (2013) and the Charles Stark Draper Prize (2020)

Student organizations
Natural Sciences Council was started in 1972 to serve as a liaison between the students in the College and the Natural Sciences faculty. Also serves as a liaison to the Senate of College Councils
Science Undergraduate Research Group that works to foster a cohesive undergraduate research community

References

External links
The University of Texas at Austin College of Natural Sciences

University of Texas at Austin schools, colleges, and departments
1883 establishments in Texas